Steffen Hoos (born 29 January 1968) is a German former biathlete. He competed in the men's 20 km individual event at the 1992 Winter Olympics.

References

External links
 

1968 births
Living people
German male biathletes
Olympic biathletes of Germany
Biathletes at the 1992 Winter Olympics
People from Gotha (district)
Sportspeople from Thuringia
20th-century German people